Shark Island is an island located with in Sydney Harbour, in New South Wales, Australia. The island was known by the local Aboriginal people as Boambilly, and the current name comes from its shape, which is claimed to resemble a shark.

The island has been the site of drownings, shipwrecks, and at least one shark attack, when, in 1877, Australian rules footballer and cricketer George Coulthard was sitting in a boat anchored offshore and was pulled overboard by a large shark. Coulthard managed to return to the boat, his attack and escape were widely reported.

Parts of the island were set aside as a recreation reserve as early as 1879 and it was also used as an animal quarantine station and naval depot until 1975. At that time it became exclusively a recreation reserve and part of the Sydney Harbour National Park.  Approved operators and a scheduled ferry service can take people to the island.

Shark Island Light is an active pile lighthouse located just north of Shark Island, an island in Sydney Harbour, New South Wales, Australia. Its light is only visible on in the fairway of the harbour, between Shark Point and Point Piper.

Contents

See also
Bradleys Head
Clark Island (New South Wales)
Dobroyd Head
Goat Island
Sow and Pigs Reef
Sydney Heads
Sydney Harbour National Park

References

External links
  [CC-By-SA]

Islands of Sydney
Sydney Harbour
Sydney localities
Sydney Harbour National Park